Frederickus is a genus of North American dwarf spiders that was first described by P. Paquin in 2008.  it contains only two species, both found in Canada and the United States: F. coylei and F. wilburi.

See also
 List of Linyphiidae species (A–H)

References

Araneomorphae genera
Linyphiidae
Spiders of North America